Svend Aage Frederiksen (5 April 1920 – 16 June 1999) was a Danish athlete. He competed in the men's hammer throw at the 1948 Summer Olympics.

References

External links
 

1920 births
1999 deaths
Athletes (track and field) at the 1948 Summer Olympics
Danish male hammer throwers
Olympic athletes of Denmark
People from Nordfyn Municipality
Sportspeople from the Region of Southern Denmark